State Road 256 (NM 256) is a  state highway in the US state of New Mexico. NM 256's southern terminus is at NM 2 south-southeast of Roswell, and the northern terminus is at U.S. Route 380 (US 380) in Roswell.

Major intersections

See also

References

256
Transportation in Chaves County, New Mexico